The Interborough Stakes, previously Interborough Handicap is an American Thoroughbred horse race held annually at the beginning of January at Aqueduct Racetrack in Ozone Park, Queens, New York. A non-graded stakes race open to fillies & mares age three and older, it is contested on dirt over a distance of six furlongs.  

From its inaugural race in 1921 through 1955, the Interborough was open to both males and females.  From 1956 on, it became a filly and mare event.

Inaugurated in 1921 at the Jamaica Race Course in Jamaica, Queens, it was raced there through 1958 after which it was hosted by the Aqueduct track. From 1968 through 1970, Belmont Park was home to the race.

From 1921 through 1924, the Interborough Handicap was contested at a distance of a mile and a sixteenth.

Ta Wee won this race in 1969 and 1970.  Affectionately won it in 1963 and 1964.

In 2013, Nicole H became the first horse to win this race three times as well as consecutively.

Past winners

 2019 - Dawn The Destroyer
 2018 - Divine Miss Grey 
 2017 - Takrees
 2016 - La Verdad
 2015 - Willet
 2014 - Lion D N A
 2013 - Nicole H
 2012 - Nicole H
 2011 - Nicole H
 2010 - Distorted Passion
 2009 - Zada Belle 
 2008 - Control System
 2007 - Oprah Winney
 2006 - Comacina
 2005 - Bank Audit
 2004 - Fit Performer
 2003 - Wilzada
 2002 - Xtra Heat
 2001 - Slash Cottage
 2000 - Seeking the Sky 
 2000 - Go Again Valid (2nd Division)
 1999 - Bimini Blues
 1998 - Evils Pic
 1997 - You'renotlistening
 1996 - Traverse City
 1995 - Lottsa Talc
 1994 - Poolesta
 1993 - Win Crafty Lady
 1992 - Wood So
 1991 - Feel The Beat
 1990 - Feel The Beat
 1989 - Cagey Exuberance
 1988 - Spring Beauty
 1987 - Genes Lady
 1986 - Genes Lady
 1985 - Am Capable
 1984 - Mickeys Echo
 1983 - Jones Time Machine
 1982 - La Vue
 1981 - Skipat
 1980 - Gladiolus 
 1979 - Gladiolus
 1978 - Tetrarquina
 1977 - Illiterate
 1976 - Donetta
 1975 - Lachesis
 1974 - Poker Night
 1973 - Soul Mate
 1972 - Aglimmer
 1971 - Process Shot
 1970 - Ta Wee
 1969 - Ta Wee
 1968 - Romanticism
 1967 - Recall
 1966 - Native Street
 1965 - Ballet Rose
 1964 - Affectionately
 1963 - Affectionately
 1962 - Windy Miss
 1961 - Rose ONeill
 1960 - Wiggle
 1959 - Nushie
 1958 - Mrs. Hellen
 1957 - Venomous
 1956 - Happy Princess
 1955 - Duc De Fer
 1954 - Laffango
 1953 - White Skies
 1952 - Squared Away
 1951 - Magic Words
 1950 - Sheilas Reward
 1949 - Royal Governor 
 1948 - Miss Disco
 1947 - Tavistock
 1946 - True North
 1945 - Greek Warrior
 1944 - Ariel Lad
 1943 - Slide Rule
 1942 - Eire
 1941 - Speed to Spare
 1940 - Grey Wolf
 1939 - Speed to Spare
 1938 - He Did
 1937 - Deliberator
 1936 - Bill Farnsworth
 1935 - Sation
 1934 - Miss Merriment (filly)
 1933 - RACE NOT RUN
 1932 - Vander Pool
 1931 - Morstone
 1930 - Finite
 1929 - Polydor
 1928 - Extreme
 1927 - Circlet (filly)
 1926 - Sabine (filly)
 1925 - Worthmore
 1924 - Big Blaze
 1923 - Knobbie (3 starters)
 1922 - Sennings Park
 1921 - Georgie (2 starters)

References
 The 2009 Interborough Handicap at ESPN
 The Interborough Handicap history at the NYRA

Ungraded stakes races in the United States
Horse races in New York City
Sprint category horse races for fillies and mares
Aqueduct Racetrack
Recurring sporting events established in 1921
1921 establishments in New York City
Jamaica Race Course